Haltemprice and Howden is a constituency in the East Riding of Yorkshire represented in the House of Commons of the UK Parliament since 1997 by David Davis, a Conservative who was also Secretary of State for Exiting the European Union until his resignation from that role on 8 July 2018.

Members of Parliament

Constituency profile
The Electoral Reform Society considers it to be historically the safest seat in the country, after North Shropshire was lost to the Liberal Democrats in 2021. Taking into account the previous seats roughly covering its boundaries, the Society considers that the seat has been held continuously by the Conservative Party since the 1837 general election.

Boundaries 

The constituency covers a large, wide area stretching from the border of Hull in the east to Howden in the west and northwards to Holme-on-Spalding-Moor towards York in the Yorkshire Wolds. The bulk of the population is centred in the villages of Willerby, Kirk Ella, Anlaby and Cottingham, which were part of the former district of Haltemprice, which was abolished in 1974. Rural Howdenshire forms the bulk of the geographical area of the constituency but provides only a small part of the total electorate.

The constituency includes many towns and villages along the A63 corridor including, Brough, Elloughton, South Cave, North Ferriby, Swanland, Gilberdyke, Newport, Welton and Melton.

2010–present: The District of East Riding of Yorkshire wards of Cottingham North, Cottingham South, Dale, Howden, Howdenshire, South Hunsley, Tranby, and Willerby and Kirk Ella.
1997–2010: The Borough of Boothferry wards of East Derwent, East Howdenshire, Gilberdyke, Holme upon Spalding Moor, Howden, Mid Howdenshire, and North Cave, and the East Yorkshire Borough of Beverley wards of Anlaby, Brough, Castle, Kirk Ella, Mill Beck and Croxby, Priory, Skidby and Rowley, South Cave, Springfield, Swanland, and Willerby.

History
The constituency was created for the 1997 general election, covering an area previously part of the Beverley and Boothferry constituencies. In 1997, it returned the Conservative David Davis, who had previously been the member for Boothferry; he was re-elected in the 2001, 2005 and 2010 general elections.

The area was placed as 10th most affluent in the country in the 2003 Barclays Private Clients survey.
Election results but one to date suggest a Safe seat, with the 2001 result being an exception when the Conservative majority was cut to less than 2,000 votes. However, no party has come as near since then.

2008 by-election

On 12 June 2008, a day after a vote on the extension of detention of terror suspects without charge, in an unexpected move, Davis took the Chiltern Hundreds, effectively resigning his seat as the constituency's MP. He stated this was to force a by-election, in which he intended to provoke a wider public debate on the single issue of the perceived erosion of civil liberties. Over the course of the following week, the campaign was launched on the theme of David Davis for Freedom.

Davis formally resigned as an MP on 18 June 2008, and the by-election took place on 10 July 2008, which Davis won.

Elections

Elections in the 2010s

Elections in the 2000s

Elections in the 1990s

See also 
 List of parliamentary constituencies in Humberside

Notes

References

Parliamentary constituencies in Yorkshire and the Humber
Constituencies of the Parliament of the United Kingdom established in 1997
Politics of the East Riding of Yorkshire